The 1990 Virginia Slims of New England was a women's tennis tournament played on indoor carpet courts in Worcester, Massachusetts in the United States and was part of the Tier II of the 1990 WTA Tour. It was the sixth and final edition of the tournament and was held from November 5 through November 11, 1990. First-seeded Steffi Graf won the singles title.

Finals

Singles
 Steffi Graf defeated  Gabriela Sabatini 7–6(7–5), 6–3
 It was Graf's 10th singles title of the year and the 54th of her career.

Doubles
 Gigi Fernández /  Helena Suková defeated  Mary Joe Fernández /  Jana Novotná 	3–6, 6–3, 6–3
 It was Fernández' 5th doubles title of the year and the 18th of her career. It was Suková's 12th doubles title of the year and the 41st of her career.

References

External links
 ITF tournament edition details

Virginia Slims of New England
Virginia Slims of New England
Virginia
Virginia